The Taxpayer Relief Act of 1997 reduced several federal taxes in the United States.

Starting in 1998, a $400 tax credit for each child under age 17 was introduced, which was later increased to $500 in 1999. This credit was phased out for high-income families.

The top marginal long term capital gains rate fell from 28% to 20%, subject to certain phase-in rules. The 15% bracket was lowered to 10%.

Roth IRAs were established, permanently exempting these retirement accounts from capital gains taxes.

The act permanently exempted from taxation the capital gains on the sale of a personal residence of up to $500,000 for married couples filing jointly and $250,000 for singles.  This exemption applies to residences the taxpayer(s) lived in for at least two years over the last five. Taxpayers can only claim the exemption once every two years.

The $600,000 estate tax exemption was to increase gradually to $1million by the year 2006. As inherited assets are automatically revalued to their current or "stepped-up" basis, any capital gains are permanently exempted from taxation.

Family farms and small businesses could qualify for an exemption of $1.3million, effective 1998. Starting in 1999, the $10,000 annual gift tax exclusion was to be corrected for inflation.

The act also provided tax exemptions for retirement accounts as well as education savings in the Hope credit and Lifetime Learning Credit. Some expiring business tax provisions were extended.

Legislative history
This was the first law devoted solely to tax cuts that Congress enacted using the fast-track budget reconciliation process.

Votes on the final version of the bill following reconciliation were as follows.

House of Representatives

Senate

The bill was signed into law by President Bill Clinton on August 5, 1997, along with the Balanced Budget Act of 1997.

References

External links
 , Taxpayer Relief Act of 1997
 Pub.L. 105-34, Taxpayer Relief Act of 1997 (readable online)
 , Taxpayer Relief Act of 1997
105th Congress / House / 1st session / Vote 350 final vote results on H R 2014: Revenue Reconciliation Act of 1997, by various groups and by individuals, from the Washington Post
Mark Bautz, How a Capital-Gains Cut Will Change the Way You Invest CNN Money, August 1, 1997

United States federal taxation legislation
Acts of the 105th United States Congress
United States federal reconciliation legislation